Gonario I Comita (also Gunnari, Gunnar, Gunnarius, Gonmar, Gunter, or Gunther) was the first known Judge of Logudoro and Arborea from perhaps as early as the late tenth century and as late as circa 1038. It is possible that he was the father of Barison I of Logudoro and Orzocorre I of Arborea.

The families of Torchitorio, Athen, Salanis, Kerki, Lacon, Gunale, Thori, Serra, Orrubu, and Sogostas can be identified in the Sardinia of his day, but to which he belonged is unknown. He had a sister named Giorgia and married Tocode. He made his capital at Tharros in Arborea.

Judges (judikes) of Arborea
Judges (judikes) of Logudoro
11th-century Italian jurists
Year of birth unknown
Year of death unknown